In the spring of 2012, Chicago Transit Authority started a station and track rehabilitation program dubbed "Red Ahead", beginning on the North Side Main Line, which is called the "Red North" project. The program monitors the full route of the Red Line, which does not include the stations of Loyola, Bryn Mawr, Sheridan, or Wilson. Stations between Wilson through Fullerton, and the State Street subway, are also not included. In May 2012, the CTA started to work on the North Side Main Line stations which includes Jarvis, Morse, Granville, Thorndale, Berwyn, Argyle, and Lawrence. The stations are listed in order, starting at Granville, then Morse, Thorndale, Argyle, Berwyn, Lawrence, and finally Jarvis. This project started in June 2012 and completed in December 2012. This project is also part of the Red Ahead's "Red & Purple Modernization" project.

Extension proposals (2006–2016)
, proposals have been underway to extend the Red Line south from 95th Street. The CTA developed nine different proposed routes, one of which includes routing the Red Line down the median of the Bishop Ford Freeway and another in the median of Interstate 57. During an alternatives analysis meeting on April 11, 2007, CTA narrowed further study down to five possible routes, two for bus rapid transit and three for heavy rail (rapid) transit. The two bus routes would travel south from the 95th/Dan Ryan terminal either down Halsted Street or Michigan Avenue, while the heavy rail routes left for consideration were the Halsted and Michigan corridors (either underground or elevated) as well as the Union Pacific Railroad corridor (elevated or trench), which would traverse southeastward toward the South Shore Line. In October 2008, the CTA commissioned a $150,000-study of an extension due south to 130th/Stony Island in the community area of Riverdale.

Extension finalization
In January 2018, the CTA finalized the route plan. The extension consists of elevated tracks from 95th Street to 119th Street, meaning that the 103rd, 111th, and Michigan stations would be elevated. The 130th station would be at-grade, making it the Red Line's only at-grade station. In August 2022, the Red Line Extension advanced to the Federal Funding Phase.  In December 2022, City Council approved the creation of a district that will send nearly $1 billion in tax revenue over the next few decades to extend the Red Line south of 95th Street, a major step toward completing the project after a half-century of false starts.  President Biden’s proposed 2024 budget includes 350M in federal funding for the red line extension project.

Alternatives
In December 2008, at the Screen 2 presentation of the federally mandated Alternatives Analysis Study, the possible corridors and modes of transit were furthered narrowed down to either Halsted Street (Bus Rapid Transit or elevated Heavy Rail Transit) and the Union Pacific Railroad corridor (elevated Heavy Rail Transit).

In December 2009, the CTA identified the Locally Preferred Alternative as the Union Pacific corridor. A map and description of the route are found here:  Multiple Environmental Impact Studies will be carried out, and will determine exact alignments and design.

The alignment consists of a new elevated rail line between 95th/Dan Ryan and a new terminal station at 130th Street, paralleling the Union Pacific Railroad and the South Shore Line through the Far South Side neighborhoods of Roseland, Washington Heights, West Pullman, and Riverdale. In addition to the terminal station at 130th, three new stations would be built at 103rd, 111th, and Michigan, and a new yard and shop would be built at 120th Street. Basic engineering, along with an environmental impact statement, are currently underway.

Red Line South Reconstruction Project
On May 19, 2013, at 2 a.m., the Dan Ryan branch closed as part of the Red Line South Reconstruction project, which cost $425 million. Track conditions were causing Red Line riders to experience longer travel times, crowded trains and unreliable service. The tracks had extensive repairs which were able to be completed over a five-month period with full closure, as opposed to a four year schedule if construction was limited to weekends only. This project improved commute time, faster rides, and the overall passenger experience. As part of the project, the Garfield, 63rd, and 87th stations were renovated and equipped with an elevator, making all Dan Ryan branch stations into ADA (Americans with Disabilities Act) compliance. The newly reconstructed Dan Ryan branch and the nine stations reopened on October 20, 2013 at 4 a.m.

Red & Purple Modernization Project
This project will completely rebuild the Lawrence, Argyle, Berwyn, and Bryn Mawr stations and the construction of a new Red-Purple Bypass, construction on the project began on October 2, 2019 and will be completed in 2025. Funding for this $2.1 billion project was secured in January 2017. Construction of the Lawrence through Bryn Mawr modernization began on May 16, 2021.

Red North station interim improvements
In November 2011, the CTA announced the Red North project as part of the Red Line Capital Investment. The cost of the project was $86 million with a $57.4 million contract granted to contractor Kiewit Infrastructure. The project included the renovation of seven stations: Granville, Morse, Thorndale, Argyle, Berwyn, Lawrence, and Jarvis. The project started on June 1, 2012 at Granville and finished its renovation on December 13, 2012 at Jarvis. The project also included the elimination of slow zones in which trains were forced to travel at reduced speeds due to sub-optimal track conditions.

References

Chicago Transit Authority